Erdélyi is a word of Hungarian origin, meaning “related to Transylvania”.

 Arthur Erdélyi (1908–1977) — Hungarian-born British mathematician
 János Erdélyi (1814–1868) — Hungarian poet, critic, author, philosopher and ethnographist
 Stefan Erdélyi (1905–1968) — Hungarian-Romanian chess master
 Tamás Erdélyi — professor of mathematics at Texas A&M University
 Vasile Erdelyi (1794–1862) - Romanian Greek Catholic bishop of Oradea Mare
 Tommy Ramone aka. Thomas Erdelyi, born Erdélyi Tamás (b. 1949) — Hungarian American record producer and musician

See also 
 Erdélyi Napló — Hungarian language weekly published in Romania
 Hungarian Hound aka. Erdélyi Kopó — breed of dog